Portrait of Jenny is an album by American jazz trumpeter Dizzy Gillespie featuring performances recorded in 1970 and originally released on the Perception label.

Reception
The Allmusic review called it a "little-known but beautifully-played combo session from the 70s".

Track listing
All compositions by Dizzy Gillespie
 "Olinga" - 7:51 
 "Diddy Wa Diddy (Mozambique)" - 10:26 
 "Me 'n Them" - 12:20 
 "Timet (Mozambique)" - 4:19

Personnel
Dizzy Gillespie - trumpet
George Davis - guitar
Mike Longo - piano 
Andy González - bass
Jerry González, Carlos "Patato" Valdés - congas 
Nicky Marrero - timbales

References 

Perception Records albums
Dizzy Gillespie albums
1970 albums
Albums recorded at Van Gelder Studio